Hopworks Urban Brewery is a brewery based in Portland, Oregon, United States. The company has a flagship restaurant on Powell Boulevard, in southeast Portland's Creston-Kenilworth neighborhood, and additional pubs at Portland International Airport and in Vancouver, Washington. Previously, there was an additional restaurant on North Williams Avenue.

Christian Ettinger is the owner and brewmaster.

History

Hopworks was founded by spouses Christian and Brandie Ettinger in 2007.

The Portland International Airport restaurant opened in 2019.

In 2020, during the COVID-19 pandemic in Oregon, Hopworks' pub on North Williams Avenue closed.

See also
 List of cideries in the United States
 List of Great American Beer Festival medalists

References

External links

 

2007 establishments in Oregon
American companies established in 2007
Beer brewing companies based in Portland, Oregon
Creston-Kenilworth, Portland, Oregon
Culture of Vancouver, Washington
Portland International Airport
Restaurants in Portland, Oregon